The Poor Little Rich Girl is a 1917 American comedy-drama film directed by Maurice Tourneur. Adapted by Frances Marion from the 1913 play by Eleanor Gates. The Broadway play actually starred future screen actress Viola Dana. The film stars Mary Pickford, Madlaine Traverse, Charles Wellesley, Gladys Fairbanks (returning from the play) and Frank McGlynn Sr.

The film was shot in Fort Lee, New Jersey when early film studios in America's first motion picture industry were based there at the beginning of the 20th century. In 1991, The Poor Little Rich Girl was deemed "culturally, historically, or aesthetically significant" by the United States Library of Congress and selected for preservation in the National Film Registry.

Plot

Gwendolyn is an 11-year-old girl who is left by her rich and busy parents to the care of unsympathetic domestic workers at the family's mansion. Her mother is only interested in her social life and her father has serious financial problems and is even contemplating suicide. 
When she manages to have some good time with an organ-grinder or a plumber, or have a mud-fight with street boys, she is rapidly brought back on the right track. 
One day, she becomes sick because the maid has given her an extra dose of sleeping medicine to be able to go out. She then becomes delirious and starts seeing an imaginary world inspired by people and things around her; the Garden of Lonely Children in the Tell-Tale forest. Her conditions worsen and Death tries to lure her to eternal rest. But Life also appears to her and finally wins.

Cast
 Mary Pickford as Gwendolyn
 Madlaine Traverse as Gwendolyn's Mother
 Charles Wellesley as Gwendolyn's Father
 Gladys Fairbanks as Jane
 Frank McGlynn Sr. as The Plumber
 Emile La Croix as The Organ Grinder
 Marcia Harris as Miss Royale
 Charles Craig as Thomas
 Frank Andrews as Potter
 Herbert Prior as The Doctor
 George Gernon as Johnny Blake
 Maxine Elliott Hicks as Susie May Squoggs

See also

 List of United States comedy films
 Mary Pickford filmography

References

Further reading 

 Schmidt, Christel, ed. (2013). Mary Pickford: Queen of the Movies. Library of Congress/University Press of Kentucky. .

External links

The Poor Little Rich Girl essay by Eileen Whitfield at National Film Registry

  
 
 The Poor Little Rich Girl essay by Daniel Eagan in America's Film Legacy: The Authoritative Guide to the Landmark Movies in the National Film Registry, A&C Black, 2010 , pages 57–28 

1917 films
1917 comedy-drama films
American silent feature films
American black-and-white films
Films directed by Maurice Tourneur
Films shot in Fort Lee, New Jersey
American films based on plays
United States National Film Registry films
Articles containing video clips
Films with screenplays by Frances Marion
1910s English-language films
1910s American films
Silent American comedy-drama films